129th meridian may refer to:

129th meridian east, a line of longitude east of the Greenwich Meridian
129th meridian west, a line of longitude west of the Greenwich Meridian